Kate Moore (born 1979) is an Australian composer currently based in the Netherlands. Moore was born in Oxfordshire, England, and has studied with Australian composers Larry Sitsky, Jim Cotter, and Michael Smetanin; Dutch composers Louis Andriessen, Martijn Padding, Diderik Wagenaar and Gilius van Bergeijk; and attended summer schools including Bang on a Can hosted by David Lang, Julia Wolfe and Michael Gordon and Tanglewood hosted by John Harbison, Michael Gandolfi and Helen Grime.

In June 2017, Moore became the first woman to win the Matthijs Vermeulen Award from the Netherlands Funds for the Performing Arts FPK for her work The Dam, in its version for British ensemble Icebreaker.

List of works

Major works 
 Piano Concerto (2019) Commissioned by Willoughby Symphony Orchestra for soloist Vivian Choi
 Space Junk (2019) Commissioned by ASKO Schoenberg for the World Minimal Music Festival
 Bosch Requiem: Lux Aeterna (2015–2018) Commissioned by November Music, Bach Festival Dordrecht, Temko
 Porcelain (2015–2017) Commissioned and performed by Slagwerk Den Haag
 Sacred Environment (2015–2017), Commissioned by The Holland Festival for the Netherlands Radio Philharmonic Orchestra and Groot Omroep Koor
 Herz Dance Cycle (2015–2016) Dance cycle
 Restraint(s) Dance Cycle (2017) Dance cycle
 Stories for Ocean Shells (2000–2015) Cello cycle
 Dances and Canons (2000–2013) Piano cycle
 The Open Road (2008) Song cycle
 Debris and Alchemy (2009)
 Violins and Skeletons (2010)
 Cello Concerto (2010–2013)
Eclipsed Vision (2006)

Orchestral and large ensemble 
 Sacred Environment, An Oratorio, 2017 Commissioned by The Holland Festival for The Netherlands Radio Philharmonic Orchestra (RFO)
 The Dam, (2015) Commissioned for The Canberra International Music Festival
 Cello Concerto, (2014) Commissioned by Föreningen Kammarmusik NU, Stockholm
  The Art of Levitation, (2013) Commissioned by Carnegie Hall
  Days & Nature, (2012) Commissioned by Fonds Podiumkunsten for ASKO
  Engraved in Stone, (2012) Commissioned by Fonds Podiumkunsten
 Klepsydra, (2009) Commissioned by Fonds Podiumkunsten for ASKO
In that house they shall enter, in that house they shall dwell, (2006) Commissioned by De Ereprijs Orkest duration

Chamber ensemble 
 Porcelain (2017) Commissioned by Slagwerk Den Haag
 Bushranger Psychodrama (2017) Co-commissioned by November music, Symphony Space, Dublin Concert Hall
 Restraint(s) (2017) Commissioned by Ken Unsworth
 Stroming, (2017) Commissioned by BRISK
 Herz (dance cycle), (2015–16), Commissioned by the Stolz Trio & Leina Roebana with assistance from, Fonds Podiumkunsten NL
 Three Letters, (2015)
 One Minute According to Your Heart (2015), Commissioned by Synergy Percussion 40U40
 Oil Drms, (2014), Commissioned by Decibel
 Mobile & Sculpture, (2013), Commissioned by Nieuw Ensemble
 Fern, (2013), Co-commissioned by The Australia Council for The Arts and Amsterdam Sinfonietta & Slagwerk Den Haag
 House of Shards and Shadows, (2013), Commissioned by Fonds Podiumkunsten
 Sarabande, (2013), Commissioned by Synergy Percussion,
 Sphinx, (2013), Commissioned by The Amsterdam Cello Octet
 Pelicans, (2011), Commissioned by Trio Scordatura with assistance from FPK
 Fatal Strangers, (2011), Commissioned by Ensemble Lucilin
No man’s Land, (2011), Commissioned by Fonds Podiumkunsten
 Violins & Skeletons, (2010), Co-Commissioned by The Carlsbad Festival of Music and ARTPWR
 Velvet, (2009)
Ridgeway, (2009), Commissioned by The People’s Commissioning Fund at Bang on a Can for The Bang on a Can
 The Open Road, (2008) Song Cycle
 Uisce, (2007)
 Antechamber, (2007)
 The Regarding Room (2005)
 101, (2003)
 Sketches of Stars, (2000), Winner: Franco-Australian Composition Competition
 Stories for Ocean Shells, (2000), Commissioned by ASCA,

Solo 
 Doodweg, (2017), Commissioned by The Australian National Carillon Society, Carillon
 Coral Speak, (2016), commissioned by Louise Devenish
 Rebellion, (2016), commissioned by Francesco Dillon
 Bestiary, (2016) commissioned by Zubin Kanga,
 Drie Segel Hat Mein Herz, (2015), Commissioned for Vox Sanguinis (November Music)
 Sliabh Beagh, (2015), Commissioned by Lisa Moore with assistance from The Australia Council for The Arts
 For Elyse, (2015), Commissioned by The National Carillon Association Canberra
 Rose, (2015), Commissioned by The Holland Festival
 Bloodmoon October, (2014)
 Synaesthesia Suite, (2014), Commissioned by Ben Remkes Cultuurfonds
 Heather, (2014) Commissioned by Julian Burnside QC
 Telephone (2014), Written for Louis Andriessen 75 birthday
 Dolorosa, (2014), Commissioned by Fonds Podiumkunsten
 Canon, (2013)
 The Hermit Thrush & The Astronaut, (2012)
 The body is an ear, (2011), Commissioned by Stichting Het Orgelpark, Amsterdam
 Velvet, (2010), Commissioned by The Australia Council for The Arts
 Broken Rosary, (2010), (From Songs for Maria Epskamp), Commissioned by The Holland Sinfonia
 Spin Bird, (2008), (for solo harp)
 Zomer, (2006), (for solo piano)
 Joy, (2003), (for solo piano)
 Red Flame Hlue Flame, (2003), (for solo clarinet), Commissioned by Apeldoorn Young Composer Meeting
 Melodrama, (2001), (for solo piano)
 Rain, (1998), (for solo snare drum)
 Homage to my boots, (1998), (for solo cello)

Electro acoustic 

 Voiceworks I, (2015), Commissioned by icinema UNSW, Stereo
 Voiceworks II, (2015), Commissioned by icinema UNSW, Stereo
 Luna Park, (2009), Commissioned by Fonds Podiumkunsten for Lunapark, Stereo
 Empty, (2001)
 Satellites, (2000)
 Sentience , (2000)
 Sand, (1998)
 Scuttly Things, (1998)

Instruments, sound sculptures and installations 

 Porcelain Project, (2016)
 Coral Speak, (2016), Commissioned by Louise Devenish WA
 Electric Mudflutes, (2015)
 Bone China, (2014),
 To That Which is Endless, (2013)
 Zandorgel, (2010),
 Klepsydra Instrument, (2009)
 Klepsydra Sculptures, (2009)
 PUUR, (2008)
 Uisce, (2007)
 Eclipsed Vision, (2006)
 Sensitive Spot, (2005)

Film, dance and theatre

Dance 

 October Restraints Ken Unsworth Studio Sydney (2017) 
 National Dutch tour Seele Herz/ Loud Shadows Liquid Events, Stolz Quartet and Leine Roebana Dance Company (2016–2017)
 Paradise Lost Korzo Theater production choreographer by Samir Calixto (2015)
 3×3 choreographed by Samir Claixto (2012)
 PUUR Korzo Theater production choreographed by Neel Verdoorn (2008)

Theater 
 The Open Road Korzo Theater Procution directed by Matthias Mooij (2008/10)
 De Stad Korzo Theater Production directed by Matthias Mooij (2007)

Film 
 Nebula, interactive AI 3D cinema, dir. Dennis del Favero, icinema, Australia
 i-land/atmoscape, interactive cinema, dir. Dennis del Favero, icinema, Australia
 Scenario, interactive cinema, dir. Dennis del Favero, Icinema, The Sydney Film Festival, Australia 
 Firewall 
 Lenz 
 Cassandra 
 Deep Heat 
 Deep Sleep, dir Dennis del Favero, icinema, Australia 
 Limbo, dir. Dennis del Favero, icinema, UNSW, Australia 
 Todtnauberg 
 Descartes

References

1979 births
Living people
Australian women composers
Australian composers
Australian National University alumni
21st-century composers
Composers for carillon
21st-century Australian musicians
21st-century women composers
Musicians from Oxfordshire
Australian expatriates in the Netherlands